The 9th constituency of the Rhône (French: Neuvième circonscription du Rhône) is a French legislative constituency in the Rhône département. Like the other 576 French constituencies, it elects one MP using a two round electoral system.

Description

The 9th constituency of the Rhône is one of two relatively large rural seats in the north of the department, along with the Rhône's 8th constituency.

The voters of the 9th have consistently returned conservative deputies to the National Assembly, this seat being one of only two in the department to resist the En Marche! landslide in 2017 by the narrow margin of 51%-49% in the second round. The constituency was held by a member of the Perrut dynasty from 1978 to 2022, with the exception of 1986 to 1988 when proportional representation was used.

Assembly Members

Election results

2022

 
 
 
 
 
|-
| colspan="8" bgcolor="#E9E9E9"|
|-

2017

 
 
 
 
 
 
|-
| colspan="8" bgcolor="#E9E9E9"|
|-

2012

 
 
 
 
 
|-
| colspan="8" bgcolor="#E9E9E9"|
|-

2007

 
 
 
 
 
 
|-
| colspan="8" bgcolor="#E9E9E9"|
|-

2002

 
 
 
 
 
 
|-
| colspan="8" bgcolor="#E9E9E9"|
|-

1997

 
 
 
 
 
 
 
 
|-
| colspan="8" bgcolor="#E9E9E9"|
|-
 
 

 
 
 
 
 

* UDF dissident

References

9